Ujaneshwar B. Banakar (born 4 May 1960 in Hirekerur) is an Indian politician, who is a member of the 14th Karnataka Legislative Assembly and represents the Hirekerur constituency.

References

1960 births
Living people
Karnataka MLAs 2013–2018
People from Haveri district
Bharatiya Janata Party politicians from Karnataka
Karnataka Janata Paksha politicians